Pampha Bhusal is a Nepali politician. She has served as an elected member of parliament and constitutional assembly as well as a minister several times. She was the second woman to lead a political party in Nepal after Sahana Pradhan; she was the leader of the United Peoples’ Front (Samyukta Janamorcha) . On 13 July 2021 she became Minister for Energy, Water Resources and Irrigation in the newly formed cabinet under Prime Minister Sher Bahadur Deuba.

Early life and career
Bhusal was born  in Kimdada, a remote village in Arghakhanchi.

She entered student politics in 1977 when she was studying in the eighth grade, and four years later, in 1981, she took active membership of the Communist Party of Nepal.

References

Government ministers of Nepal
Living people
Communist Party of Nepal (Maoist Centre) politicians
20th-century Nepalese women politicians
20th-century Nepalese politicians
Tribhuvan University alumni
Nepalese Hindus
Nepal MPs 2017–2022
Nepal Communist Party (NCP) politicians
People of the Nepalese Civil War
People from Arghakhanchi District
Women government ministers of Nepal
Members of the 1st Nepalese Constituent Assembly
1962 births